"Right" is a song by English musician David Bowie from his album Young Americans, released on 7 March 1975. Recorded on 14–18 August and 20–24 November 1974 at Sigma Sound in Philadelphia, "Right" is the last of four tracks on side one of Young Americans, and the B-side of the single "Fame", released in August 1975.

Music and lyrics
The repetition of the main lyrics—"Taking it all the right way / Never no turning back"—the prominence of the percussion and bass, and the emphasis on the backing singers made "Right" one of the album's "authentically soulful" songs, according to professor of music Ian Chapman. Chapman describes it as having "no hidden Bowie-esque irony, barb, or angst", although Alex Petridis calls it a "twitchy, agitated note-to-self".

The backing vocalists included Luther Vandross and an old friend of Bowie's, Geoff MacCormack; it was the only track on Young Americans to feature MacCormack. The call and response between Bowie and the backing singers "lends an air of immaculate sophistication to the lyric's paean to positive thinking", according to Nicholas Pegg. In 1975 Bowie called the song a mantra: "People forget what the sound of Man's instinct is—it's a drone, a mantra. And people say, 'Why are so many things popular that just drone on and on?' But that's the point really. It reaches a particular vibration, not necessarily a musical level."

Toward the end of Alan Yentob's film about Bowie, Cracked Actor (1975), Bowie, Luther Vandross, Robin Clark, and Ava Cherry are seen rehearsing "Right" for the 1974 "Soul Tour", although in the end it was never performed live.

Personnel
 Producer:
 Tony Visconti
 Engineering:
Carl Paruolo
 Musicians:
David Bowie: lead vocal
Carlos Alomar: rhythm guitar
David Sanborn: alto sax
Mike Garson: clavinet
Willie Weeks: bass guitar
Andy Newmark: drums
Larry Washington: conga
Luther Vandross, Robin Clark, Ava Cherry, and Geoff MacCormack: backing vocals

See also
List of songs recorded by David Bowie

References

1974 songs
1975 singles
British soul songs
David Bowie songs
Funk songs
RCA Records singles
Wikipedia requested audio of songs
Song recordings produced by Tony Visconti
Songs written by David Bowie